Feothanach or an Fheothanach (formerly anglicised as Feohanagh) is a small townland in the Corca Dhuibhne Gaeltacht, located  north-west of Dingle on the Dingle Peninsula in County Kerry, Ireland. It is at the foot of Mount Brandon.

RTÉ newsreader Siún Nic Gearailt is from the area as well as RTÉ's and TG4's Dáithí Ó Sé. 

Local amenities include An Cúinne Pub, Dingle's Coláiste Gaeilge, and a local RTÉ Raidió na Gaeltachta studio.

There is an Irish College in the village operated by the Coláistí Chorca Dhuibhne in the summer months. Students attend classes in the local primary school and activities are held in the local community hall in the village.

References

Gaeltacht places in County Kerry
Townlands of County Kerry
Gaeltacht towns and villages